Marie Elisabeth Wrede (born 1898 in Salzburghofen, died 1981 in Boulogne) was an Austrian painter, best known for her portraits.

Wrede studied with Fernand Léger in Paris. She associated with Paul Valéry, Robert and Sonia Delaunay and also Pablo Picasso, whom she drew.

She was married to Paul Arnold Hallgarten (born 7 December 1902 in Frankfurt am Main, died 1930 in Salzburg), the son of Fritz Hallgarten and Yella Bonn, a cousin of Moritz Julius Bonn, who in turn was a cousin of the art historian Aby Warburg.

Works in museums and collections 
 The Musée national d'art modern in Paris (Centre Pompidou) houses several of her works.
 Wrede used drypoint etching to capture a portrait of her friend Paul Valéry, now in the collection of the Museum Europäische Kunst in Nörvenich.
 She painted a portrait of the rector of Munich University Reinhard Demoll in 1959/1960. She was connected to the university through her husband's uncle, the lawyer and Germanist Robert Hallgarten (1870-1924).

References

Sources 
 
 

Austrian painters
1898 births
1981 deaths
20th-century Austrian women artists
20th-century Austrian painters
Austrian women painters
Austrian expatriates in France